The 2017 season of Atlético Petróleos de Luanda is the club's 36th season in the Girabola, the Angolan Premier football League and 36th consecutive season in the top flight of Angolan football. In 2017,  the club participated in the Girabola and the Angola Cup.

Squad information

Players

Pre-season transfers

Mid-season transfers

Staff

Overview

Angolan League

League table

Results

Results summary

Results by round

Match details

Angola Cup

Results summary

Round of 16

Quarter-finals

Semi-finals

Final

Season statistics

Appearances and goals

|-
! colspan="10" style="background:#DCDCDC; text-align:center" | Goalkeepers

|-
! colspan="10" style="background:#DCDCDC; text-align:center" | Defenders

|-
! colspan="10" style="background:#DCDCDC; text-align:center" | Midfielders

|-
! colspan="10" style="background:#DCDCDC; text-align:center" | Forwards

|-
! colspan="10" style="background:#DCDCDC; text-align:center" | Opponents

|- 
! colspan="10" style="background:#DCDCDC; text-align:center" | Total
|- align=center
| colspan="4"| || 385(87) || 49 || 330(75) || 42 || 55(12) || 7

Scorers

Clean sheets

Total results

See also
 List of Atlético Petróleos de Luanda players

External links
 PetroLuanda.co.ao Official club website 
 Girabola.com profile
 Zerozero.pt profile
 Facebook profile

References

Atlético Petróleos de Luanda seasons
Petro de Luanda